The 2013 Men's Pan American Cup was the fourth edition of the Men's Pan American Cup, the quadrennial men's international field hockey championship of the Americas organized by the Pan American Hockey Federation. It was held between 10 and 17 August 2013 in  Brampton, Canada.

The tournament doubled as the qualifier for two major international tournaments: the winner qualified directly to the 2014 World Cup, and the three teams not qualifying through the 2014 South American Games or the 2014 Central American and Caribbean Games qualified for the 2015 Pan American Games to be held in Toronto, Canada. Also, the top 6 teams qualified for the next Pan American Cup, while the bottom two will need to compete in the Pan American Challenge.

Argentina won the tournament for the second time after defeating Canada 4–0 in the final. As they had already secured an automatic berth at the 2014 World Cup thanks to a second-place finish at the World League Semifinal in Johor Bahru, Malaysia, their quota was immediately awarded to first reserve team Korea.

Qualification
In early 2011 the Pan American Hockey Federation (PAHF) announced a new qualification system for the Men's Pan American Cups, recognizing the differences in team strength of the top playing nations and the remaining associations. The top six nations at the 2009 Pan American Cup now will qualify directly with the remaining two spots being taken at the newly created Pan American Challenge, which was held in 2011 in Rio de Janeiro, Brazil.

Umpires
Below are the 11 umpires appointed by the Pan American Hockey Federation:

Daniel Basto Rivero (MEX)
Sebastián Bustamante (CHI)
Gavin Caldecott (CAN)
Nku Davis (TRI)
Federico García (URU)
Duvaughn Henlon (JAM)
Grant Hundley (USA)
Ilanggo Kanabathu (MAS)
Andrés Ledesma (ARG)
Raghu Prasad (IND)
Donovan Simmons (BER)

Results
All times are Eastern Daylight Time (UTC−04:00)

Pools were based on FIH Men's Outdoor Rankings as of 13 August 2012.

First round
Uruguay and Trinidad and Tobago faced traveling hurdles that required to alter the competition schedule. Both teams' opening matches were moved to Monday 12 August, while the remainder of the schedule was moved down a day.

Pool A

Pool B

Fifth to eighth place classification

5–8th place semi-finals

Seventh place game

Fifth place game

First to fourth place classification

Semi-finals

Third place game

Final

Statistics

Final standings

Awards

See also
2013 Women's Pan American Cup

References

External links
Official website

 
2013
Pan American Cup
Men's Pan American Cup
2013 Men's Pan American Cup
International field hockey competitions hosted by Canada
Sport in Brampton
Pan American Cup